Haitian Olympic Committee (IOC code: HAI) is the National Olympic Committee representing Haiti. It was first created in 1914 and was recognized by the International Olympic Committee in 1924.

References

External links 
Haitian Olympic Committee

Haiti
Olympic
Haiti at the Olympics
1914 establishments in Haiti
Sports organizations established in 1914